Tarzeena, Queen of Kong Island is a 2008 American made for cable erotic film directed by Fred Olen Ray (under the pseudonym Nicholas Juan Medina). It is also known by the alternative name Tarzeena: Jiggle in the Jungle. The film is an x-rated parody of the Tarzan character created by Edgar Rice Burroughs.

Plot
After the death of her uncle Milton, Mandy is to inherit his property and money. She and Jed Slater, an attorney, travel to Kong Island to locate the whereabouts of Bradley, Milton's son, and Bradley's infant daughter who crashed on the island two decades earlier. After arriving on the island, Mandy and Jed Slater meet up with Ted, Mandy's boyfriend, Jack Carver, a jungle guide, and Shana, Jack's girlfriend. Later the group comes face to face with Tarzeena, the jungle queen, and Tabonga, a gorilla. Tarzeena turns out to be Bradley's missing grown-up daughter. Dr. Mortimer, a mad scientist, kidnaps both Tabonga and Tarzeena so he can use them as guinea pigs for his evil experiments. Mandy, Jed, Jack, Ted and Shana all come to Tarzeena's rescue and destroy Dr. Mortimer. In the end, Mandy, Ted and Tarzeena return home to America.

Cast
 Christine Nguyen as Tarzeena
 Syren as Shana
 Nicole Sheridan as Mandy
 Evan Stone as Jack Carver
 Alexandre Boisvert as Ted (credited as Voodoo)
 Ed Polgardy as Jed Slater
 Michael Gaglio as Dr. Mortimer

Background
The film was produced by the production company American Independent Productions and distributed by Retromedia Entertainment. It was broadcast several times in Summer 2008 at fixed times and on demand on the premium channel Cinemax. The film was shot simultaneously with other films, including Super Ninja Doll.

Reception
Like Super Ninja Doll, Tarzeena, Queen of Kong Island had worse ratings. In addition, the action in the film was much criticized. Also, the film, compared to Super Ninja Doll, had less than good ratings.

References

External links
 
 
 
 

2008 television films
2008 films
American erotic films
Films directed by Fred Olen Ray
Jungle girls
2000s American films